HMNZS Wellington was a  frigate of the Royal Navy and the Royal New Zealand Navy (RNZN). She was decommissioned in 1999 and sunk in 2005.

Refit
On arrival in New Zealand, Wellington was decommissioned and entered an extended refit which ended in 1986. The limited modernization proved difficult and took an unexpected 4 years. When inspected prior to purchase in 1981, she was in the condition expected for a Royal Navy (RN) frigate after a dozen years' service. However, in 1982 the frigate conducted a four-month winter patrol in the postwar Falklands exclusion zone with the other four RN unmodernised Leanders. Sea conditions in the Falkland exclusion zone meant more expensive hull repair was needed. Large-scale energy projects in New Zealand, particularly Marsden Point, resulted in a loss of key dockyard staff and recruitment difficulties. The installation of additional fuel tanks to extend the range of South Pacific operations proved difficult and dirty work. A new gunnery control system (RCA-76) along with surface and navigation radar were fitted, escape hatches were enlarged and asbestos was removed. The original estimated cost of transferring and refitting Bacchante and Dido to RNZN was $100m in 1981. By 1985 it reached $263m Other minor changes were also made as a result of practical experiences of British frigates during the Falklands War.

Later refits saw new long-range air surveillance radar in place of the old 965 bedstead, with the Thales LW08 (1994)  and the original Seacat missile removed and replaced by the Phalanx CIWS (1998).

Operational history

Like her sister-ship , Wellington was stood to during the First Coup in Fiji in 1987 to evacuate New Zealand and other foreign nationals should the need have arisen.

Vessels from the navies of Australia, Britain, France, Greece, India, Italy, Japan, Malaysia, the Netherlands, New Zealand, Pakistan, Papua New Guinea, Solomon Islands, United States and Vanuatu were represented.

In 1994, Wellington contributed to the international Peace Keeping initiative in Bougainville along with Canterbury.

In 1995/1996, Wellington deployed to the Persian Gulf on the first of the RNZN deployments supporting the MIF (Multinational Interception Force) enforcing UN sanctions on Iraqi trade through the Gulf. Wellington successfully detained a number of vessels exporting dates from and attempting to import prohibited cargoes to Iraq. The frigate attended peace talks at Bougainville in July and August 1990.  On 23 February 2017, it was announced by NZDF that the New Zealand Operations Service Medal (NZOSM) had been awarded to personnel who were in Bougainville for the Operation BIGTALK peace talks.

Sinking

HMNZS Wellington was deliberately sunk off the south coast of Wellington, New Zealand, in Houghton Bay, just east of Island Bay, Wellington.

Although the ship was due to be sunk at 3pm on 12 November 2005, this was delayed for 24 hours due to weather. The next day, the sinking was delayed by another 30 minutes due to the entanglement of a detonation cable under the frigate. At 3:30pm on 13 November, the ship was scuttled and took a minute and 55 seconds to sink. During a storm in February 2006, the ship broke up and is now lying in two sections on the seabed close to where it was sunk at 

See also
 Frigates of the Royal New Zealand Navy

References

External links

 Sunken Treasure - TVNZ video segment on the sinking (14:40)
 Sink F69!  (Dive the Trail - Wellington, Waikato, Canterbury)

Leander-class frigates of the Royal New Zealand Navy
Shipwrecks of the Cook Strait
Maritime incidents in 2005
Wellington
Ships built on the River Tyne
Ships built by Vickers Armstrong